Joachim Rohweder (2 September 1841 – 29 December 1905) was a German teacher, ornithologist and bird conservationist. He wrote one of the earliest comprehensive works on the birds of the Schleswig-Holstein region.

Life and work 

Rohweder was born in Wapelfeld in a farming household. At the age of seven, he would have experienced the First Schleswig War. He studied at the village school and then at Hohenwestedt before training as a teacher. He was an assistant teacher at Hamburg during which time he attended lectures at the Johanneum. In 1862 he studied at a teacher training college in Bad Segeberg and took a special interest in the natural sciences. He graduated in 1865 and became a private tutor at the home of a magistrate named Stolz in Leck. He then worked at a naval school in Flensburg and in 1866 he moved to the Royal Gymnasium in Husum where he lived and worked for nearly forty years until his death.  

Rohweder became an expert on the birds of the Schleswig-Holstein region and published notes in the ornithological newsletter edited by Rudolf Blasius. He became a campaigner for the protection of birds in the region and co-founded an animal protection association in 1879. The government of Schleswig-Holstein sent him to Heligoland in 1893 where he studied trapping practices and made suggestions for stopping them. He was involved in the protection of breeding seabird colonies on the islands of Sylt, Norderoog, and Süderoog. He was an ardent fan of Theodor Storm's poetry.

References

External links 
 Publications
 Rohweder, J. (1875) Die Vögel Schleswig-Holsteins und ihre Verbreitung in der Provinz nebst einer graphischen Darstellung ihrer Zug- und Brutverhältnisse. In: Jahresbericht, Königliches Gymnasium und Höhere Bürgerschule zu Husum, 14. März 1875: 1-24	
 Rohweder, J. (1875) Die Vögel Schleswig-Holstein′s und ihre Verbreitung in der Provinz. Thomsen, Husum
 Rohweder, J. (1876) Bemerkungen zur Schleswig-holsteinischen Ornithologie. Schriften des Naturwissenschaftlichen Vereins für Schleswig-Holstein 2:117-140
 Unsere Schnepfen (1902) ["Our snipes"]
 Grave of Rohweder

1841 births
1905 deaths
German conservationists
German ornithologists
People from Schleswig-Holstein